Myotubularin-related protein 13 is a protein that in humans is encoded by the SBF2 gene.

The family of myotubularin-related proteins includes lipid phosphatases, such as MTM1 (MIM 600415), and pseudophosphatases, such as SBF1 (MIM 603560) and SBF2. Pseudophosphatases contain inactivating substitutions at the catalytic cysteine [supplied by OMIM].

References

Further reading

External links
  GeneReviews/NCBI/NIH/UW entry on Charcot-Marie-Tooth Neuropathy Type 4